Andrew Corporation, a formerly independent manufacturer of hardware for communications networks, was founded by Victor J. Andrew and established in Orland Park, Illinois in 1937.  Founder, Dr. Floyd L. English, turned his acumen for physics into a successful career as a key figure at Andrew Corporation. He served for over 20 years as President, CEO, and Chairman at Andrew.

Andrew Corporation products included antennas, cables, amplifiers, repeaters, transceivers, as well as software and training for the broadband and cellular industries. It supports customers from 35 countries across Asia-Pacific, Europe, and the Americas, with manufacturing plants in 12 countries, employing over 4,500 people. Andrew sales in 1999 exceeded US$791 million. Specific product applications include antennas, cables, amplifiers, repeaters, transceivers, as well as software and training in radio and other wireless communication systems.

Andrew holds subsidiaries in Sweden, Switzerland, Russia, Canada, Finland, Mexico, Spain, Germany, Brazil, South Africa, France, Italy, and China. In 1986 Andrew acquired Scientific Communications, Inc., and Kintec Corp, further acquiring The Antenna Company in 1996. Andrew acquired Channel Master's Smithfield, North Carolina satellite dish factory, equipment, inventory and intellectual property in an $18 million deal after that firm filed for chapter 11 bankruptcy protection on October 2, 2003.

Andrew Corporation was acquired by CommScope for $2.6 billion in June 2007.

References

External links
official site
1999 factsheet
MBTA To Wire For Cell Phones

Technology companies established in 1937
Companies that filed for Chapter 11 bankruptcy in 2003
2007 mergers and acquisitions
Defunct technology companies of the United States
Companies based in Will County, Illinois
1937 establishments in Illinois